The 2023 Guatemala City mayoral election will be held on 25 June 2023, to elect the mayor of Guatemala City, Department of Guatemala and thirteen members of the Municipal Council.  Incumbent Ricardo Quiñónez Lemus is eligible for another term.

Council composition
The table below shows the composition of the political groups in the Municipal Council at the present time.

Candidates

Declared major candidates

Other declared candidates

Opinion polls

References

2023 in Guatemala
Elections in Guatemala